Sheila Jones (born February 16, 1956) is a member of the House of Representatives in the U.S. state of Georgia.  Jones is a Democrat representing District 53, which encompasses parts of Cobb and Fulton counties.

External links
Georgia House of Representatives bio

Living people
Politicians from Atlanta
Democratic Party members of the Georgia House of Representatives
Women state legislators in Georgia (U.S. state)
21st-century American politicians
21st-century American women politicians
1956 births